The Shaver Lake Railroad was a standard gauge logging railroad that operated in the Sierra Nevada of Fresno County, California. The line was abandoned in 1927.

History

The Shaver Lake Railroad traces its beginnings to October 31, 1891, when the Fresno Flume and Irrigation Company was incorporated to build  of track from the lumber mill at Shaver to the forest timber.  

In 1907, Southern California Edison bought the holdings of the Fresno Flume & Irrigation Co. and named the railroad the Shaver Lake Railroad. Trackage was extended  from a connection with the San Joaquin and Eastern Railroad at Dawn to Shaver. On September 8, 1908, SCE reincorporated the holdings under the name of Fresno Flume and Lumber Company (also known as the Fresno Lumber and Irrigation Company).  

In 1919 the Shaver Lake Railroad was sold to Shaver Lake Lumber Company and the track was extended six miles south of Shaver into the forest. The railroad was abandoned in 1927.

See also
List of defunct California railroads

References

Defunct California railroads
Logging railroads in the United States
History of the Sierra Nevada (United States)